Josep Maria Fusté Blanch (born April 15, 1941) is a retired Spanish footballer who played as a midfielder and who was captain of FC Barcelona during the 1960s and early 1970s. In 1964, together with Luis Suárez, Amancio Amaro, José Ángel Iribar and his FC Barcelona teammate, Chus Pereda, he helped Spain win the European Championship. He also played for CA Osasuna and Hércules CF. After retiring as a player he worked as a public relations executive for Codorniu, a Catalan sparkling wine company. He also served as president of the FC Barcelona veterans association and publicly supported Sixto Cambra, a Catalan nationalist, who stood against Josep Lluís Nuñez in the 1989 FC Barcelona presidential elections.

Club career
Born in Linyola, Lleida, Catalonia, Fusté first joined FC Barcelona in 1958 and then went on loan to CA Osasuna. While at Osasuna, he made his Primera División debut on September 3, 1961 and scored a penalty in a 2–2 draw with RCD Español. During his ten seasons playing for the senior team at FC Barcelona, the club finished second four times in La Liga, but were never champions. However, during the 1960s and early 1970s, they did find success in various cup competitions. In 1962 Fusté played in his first European club final when he played for FC Barcelona in the second leg of the Inter-Cities Fairs Cup final. They drew 1–1 on the night, but Barça lost 3–7 to Valencia CF on aggregate. In 1966, he played in another Fairs Cup final and this time helped FC Barcelona beat Real Zaragoza 4–3 on aggregate. In 1968, he was a member of the team that beat Real Madrid 1–0 in the final of the Copa del Generalísimo. FC Barcelona subsequently qualified for the following seasons European Cup Winners Cup and made it all the way to the final only to lose 3–2 to ŠK Slovan Bratislava.

In 1971, Fusté inspired FC Barcelona to one more Copa win. In the 1970–71 season, FC Barcelona narrowly missed out on winning La Liga, losing by a single point to Valencia CF. The two teams also met in the Copa del Generalísimo final. With Valencia CF winning 2–0, Fusté, who had come on as a substitute, scored the first of four FC Barcelona goals that eventually led to a 4–3 victory in extra-time. In 1972, after 197 La Liga games and 47 goals, Fusté left CF Barcelona and joined Hércules CF, then playing in the Segunda División.

After he retired, Fusté played with the FC Barcelona veterans team and continued to put in impressive performances until he retired in 2000. He also coached on the veteran team.

International career
Fusté  also played eight times for Spain, scoring three goals. José Villalonga gave him his debut on 11 March 1964 in the first-leg of the European Championship quarter-final against Republic of Ireland. He scored as Spain won 5–1 and went on to help them win the competition. He also played for Spain at the World Cup in 1966 and during the group stages of the competition he scored in the 2–1 defeat against Germany.

International goals

Honours

Club
Barcelona
Inter-Cities Fairs Cup: 1965–66, 1972
Spanish Cup: 1962–63, 1967–68, 1970–71

International
Spain
European Championship: 1964

References

External links
 
 National team data 
 
 FC Barcelona archives 
 FC Barcelona profile
 

1941 births
Living people
People from Pla d'Urgell
Sportspeople from the Province of Lleida
Spanish footballers
Footballers from Catalonia
Association football midfielders
La Liga players
FC Barcelona players
CA Osasuna players
Hércules CF players
Spain B international footballers
Spain international footballers
1964 European Nations' Cup players
1966 FIFA World Cup players
UEFA European Championship-winning players